Don Huber (born May 1, 1957 in St. Louis, Missouri) is a retired American soccer forward who played professionally in the North American Soccer League and Major Indoor Soccer League.  He also played for St. Louis Kutis S.C. when it won the 1986 National Challenge Cup.

Huber attended St. Louis University where he played on the men's soccer team from 1975 to 1978. He was a 1978 Honorable Mention (third team) All American. He was inducted into the school's Athletic Hall of Fame in 1995.  In 1979, he began his professional career with the Minnesota Kicks of the North American Soccer League. He then moved to the Tulsa Roughnecks. In the Fall of 1980, he signed with the Baltimore Blast of the Major Indoor Soccer League. He retired from professional soccer at the end of the season and returne to St. Louis where he joined St. Louis Kutis S.C. In 1986, Huber and his team mates won the National Challenge Cup.

He was inducted into the St. Louis Soccer Hall of Fame in 2009.

References

External links
 NASL/MISL stats

1957 births
Living people
American soccer players
Baltimore Blast (1980–1992) players
Major Indoor Soccer League (1978–1992) players
Minnesota Kicks players
North American Soccer League (1968–1984) players
Soccer players from St. Louis
Saint Louis University alumni
Saint Louis Billikens men's soccer players
St. Louis Kutis players
Tulsa Roughnecks (1978–1984) players
Association football forwards